The League Alliance was the first semi-affiliated minor league baseball league. Proposed by Al Spalding on January 15, 1877. Independent baseball teams were to affiliate with National League teams, which would honor their respective contracts. The league only existed for one season, 1877, though another version was attempted in 1882.

Teams

 Alaskas
 Albany M. N. Nolan
 Auburn Auburnians
 Binghamton Cricket
 Brooklyn Chelsea 
 Buffalo Bisons
 Chicago Fairbanks 
 Elizabeth Resolute
 Erie
 Evansville Red 
Fall River Cascades
 Hornellsville Hornells 
 Indianapolis Blues 
 Janesville Mutual 
 Livingston
 Lowell Ladies' Men
 Ludlow
 Memphis Reds 
 Milwaukee Cream Citys
 Minneapolis Browns 
 Philadelphia Athletic 
 Philadelphia Defiance 
 Springfield Champion City 
 St. Paul Red Caps 
 Syracuse Star 
 Troy Haymakers 
 Wheeling Standard 
 Winona Clipper

See also 
 1877 in baseball
 Northwestern League, considered the first baseball minor league

References

External links
League history

Defunct minor baseball leagues in the United States
Sports leagues established in 1877
1877 establishments in the United States